David Giuntoli (born June 18, 1980) is an American actor. He portrayed Det. Nick Burkhardt in the NBC supernatural drama Grimm, and has appeared in films such  as 13 Hours: The Secret Soldiers of Benghazi (2016) and Buddymoon (2016). He currently portrays Eddie Saville on the television series A Million Little Things.

Early life
Giuntoli was born in Milwaukee, Wisconsin, to Mary and David Giuntoli. His father is of Italian descent while his mother is of Polish and German descent. He was raised in Huntleigh, a suburb of St. Louis, Missouri. Admitting to not being very athletic as a boy Giuntoli stated "I was like three feet shorter than I am now until I was a sophomore in high school." He says his head has stayed the same size. "I was an awkward little fellow. In high school I started gravitating a little toward acting."<ref name="Hollywood">{{cite web |url= |title=Rising Star: Grimm'''s David Giuntoli |work=Access Hollywood |date=October 28, 2011 |access-date=March 8, 2013 }}</ref> After graduating from St. Louis University High School in 1998, he attended Indiana University Bloomington, earning a bachelor's degree in International Business and Finance in 2002.

Giuntoli returned to St. Louis after college. However, his heart was in being an entertainer instead of a career in finance, something his family realized early on as he always enjoyed making people laugh from a young age. Reconnecting with his high school theater teacher, he began taking acting lessons locally.

Career
His first career break came in 2003 when he was discovered by talent scouts for MTV and cast in the network's reality series Road Rules for its South Pacific season. The three-month adventure in the South Pacific, and a subsequent appearance on the seventh season of Real World/Road Rules Challenge provided the resources to pay off his college debt and further cemented his decision to pursue acting as a full-time career.

In 2007, he moved to Los Angeles to further pursue an acting career. There he studied under director and acting teacher Chris Fields before joining the Echo Theater Company. A long series of guest appearances on various TV series and TV movies followed, including Nip/Tuck, Veronica Mars, Grey's Anatomy, Ghost Whisperer, Privileged, Without a Trace, and Cold Case among others. Giuntoli was also in consideration for the title role of the relaunched Superman movie Man of Steel but was eventually beaten out by English actor Henry Cavill.

His biggest role in TV to date is the series Grimm, which premiered in October 2011 and ran for six seasons and 123 episodes until March 31, 2017. He played the lead role of Nick Burkhardt, a Grimm detective who hunts creatures. In addition to his work on Grimm, Giuntoli was seen in 2012 in the motion picture Caroline and Jackie in a supporting role. He played the role of Scott Wickland, DS agent, in 13 Hours, directed by Michael Bay. In 2016, he played the lead role of David in the comedy film Buddymoon.

He is currently starring in the ABC series A Million Little Things, which premiered in September 2018.

Personal life
Giuntoli dated fellow Road Rules castmate Cara Zavaleta.

He often rode his bicycle to the set of Grimm. During a 2012 break in production, Giuntoli visited an elephant orphanage in Kenya, adopting one of the animals.

Giuntoli married his Grimm'' co-star Bitsie Tulloch in June 2017. They announced her pregnancy with their first child in October 2018, a girl, Vivian, who was born in February 2019. In January 2020, the family moved to Washington State to be closer to family and their work in Vancouver.

Filmography

Film

Television

References

External links
 

1980 births
Living people
Male actors from St. Louis
Indiana University Bloomington alumni
Male actors from Milwaukee
American male television actors
American people of Italian descent
American people of German descent
American people of Polish descent
Road Rules cast members
21st-century American male actors
The Challenge (TV series) contestants